Drasteria rada is a moth of the family Erebidae. It is found in Ukraine, southern Russia, Kazakhstan, Turkey, Georgia, Armenia, Iran, Kyrgyzstan, Mongolia and China (Tibet, Qinghai, Xinjiang).

The wingspan is about 31 mm.

References

Drasteria
Moths described in 1848
Moths of Asia